The 2011 TIM Supercoppa Italiana Final was the 24th edition of the Supercoppa, an annual football match contested by the winners of the previous season's Serie A and Coppa Italia competitions.

The match, the curtain raiser to the new football season in Italy, was the 208th Derby della Madonnina between Milan and defending champions Internazionale, marking the first time these two sides have met in this competition. The match was played at the Bird’s Nest Stadium in Beijing on Saturday 6 August 2011. Milan won the title 2–1.

Milan qualified to take part by winning the 2010–11 Serie A title while their city rivals Inter qualified by winning the 2011 Coppa Italia Final. Inter are the competition's defending champions, having beaten Roma 3–1 in last season's contest. Both teams have appeared in the Supercoppa final eight times during its history, Milan winning six times and Inter five.

Match details

See also 
2010–11 Serie A
2010–11 Coppa Italia

References 

2011
Supercoppa 2011
Supercoppa 2011
Supercoppa Italiana
2011–12 in Italian football cups